Mali i Lopës (in English meaning Cow's Mountain), is a mountain found in eastern Albania in the Dibër County.
Most of the mountain is covered in lush woodland while there are some patches of grass mainly on the mountain's western slopes.

Settlements
Mali i Lopës is situated in central east Albania, far from any large city of the country. Nevertheless, two new urban settlements, established as mining towns, lie on the slopes of the mountain. Bulqiza, which is located north of the mountain and Krasta, lying on the eastern slope of Mali i Lopës.

Nearest villages to the mountain include:
 Plani i Bardhë
 Tërnovë
 Fushë-Bulqizë
 Valikardhë

Lakes
Mali i Lopës contains the largest mountain lakes in Albania.

List of lakes on Mali i Lopës:

English  -  Albanian

 Sope Lake  -  Liqeni i Sopës
 White Lake  -  Liqeni i Bardhë
 Sopot Lake  -  Liqeni i Sopotit
 Black Lake  -  Liqeni i Zi
 Koces Lake  -  Liqeni i Kocesit

Rivers

Mali i Lopës is the source of some early tributaries for the Black Drin and Mat River.

References

Mountains of Albania
Protected areas of Dibër County